= Samyavadi Sangstha =

The Samyavadi Sangstha (Bengali: সাম্যবাদী সংস্থা, 'Communist Organization') was a political party in West Bengal, India. It was formed after a split in the West Bengal unit of the Revolutionary Socialist Party in 1950. Samyavadi Sangstha was led by Promode Sinha Roy and N. Samajpati. In 1954 the organization merged with two other groups, forming the United Marxist League (later renamed as the Communist League).
